The Mayor of Tawa officiated over the Tawa Flat Borough of New Zealand, which was administered by the Tawa Borough Council. The office existed from 1953 until 1989, when Tawa Borough was amalgamated into the Wellington City Council as part of the 1989 local government reforms. There were six holders of the office.

History
George Turkington was elected the first Mayor of Tawa in 1953. He resigned after only six months after he was appointed to the Local Government Commission. Turkington was replaced by Maurice McDonald Davidson who himself resigned after 18 months after deciding to move elsewhere. Mervyn Kemp then became mayor and held the office for 28 years. Upon Kemp's retirement, councillor Roy Mitchell was elected mayor for three years. Doris Mills (Tawa's only female mayor) was elected in 1986 but died in office 17 June 1987. She was succeeded by David Watt who was Tawa's final mayor.

Upon amalgamation with the Wellington City Council, Watt was elected a councillor for the new Tawa Ward alongside Kerry Prendergast. He served as Wellington's deputy-mayor from 1989 until he retired in 1995. Prendergast succeeded him as deputy from 1995 to 2001, when she was elected Mayor of Wellington, a post she was to hold until 2010 when she was defeated.

List of mayors
Mayors of Tawa were:

References

Tawa
Tawa